Lukyantsevo is a rural locality (a village) in Slednevskoye Rural Settlement, Alexandrovsky District, Vladimir Oblast, Russia. The population was 97 as of 2010. There is 1 street.

Geography 
Lukyantsevo is located 15 km north of Alexandrov (the district's administrative centre) by road. Isayevka is the nearest rural locality.

References 

Rural localities in Alexandrovsky District, Vladimir Oblast